Orta Qəsil (also, Orta Kasil’) is a village in the Agdash Rayon of Azerbaijan. The village forms part of the municipality of Qulbəndə.

References 

Populated places in Agdash District